The 1920 Victorian state election was held in the Australian state of Victoria on Thursday 21 October 1920 to elect the 65 members of the state's Legislative Assembly.

Background

The Nationalist party had reunited after the 1917 election in which the Nationalist members supporting John Bowser defeated those supporting the former Premier Alexander Peacock over his decision to increase country rail fares, and formed a majority government with 40 members. Bowser resigned as premier in March 1918, having little taste for the office, and was replaced by Peacock supporter Harry Lawson.

Meanwhile, in rural Victoria, the Victorian Farmers' Union had been gathering support and was looking to gain more seats from the Nationalists in these regions. This election would be their debut as a major force in Victorian politics where neither the Nationalists and their successors or Labor could form government without their support (or that of their successors, the Country Party) until 1952.

Results

Legislative Assembly

|}
Notes:
Eleven seats were uncontested at this election, and were retained by the incumbent parties:
Nationalist (3): Allandale, Gippsland West, Ovens
Labor (7): Abbotsford, Carlton, Flemington, Port Fairy, Richmond, Warrenheip, Williamstown
VFU (1): Wangaratta

See also
Candidates of the 1920 Victorian state election
Members of the Victorian Legislative Assembly, 1920–1921
1919 Victorian Legislative Council election

References

1920 elections in Australia
Elections in Victoria (Australia)
1920s in Victoria (Australia)
October 1920 events